Time and Tide: The Museum of Great Yarmouth Life, located in Great Yarmouth, Norfolk, United Kingdom, is set in one of the UK's best-preserved Victorian herring curing works and is Norfolk's third largest museum. The museum is centred on Great Yarmouth's rich maritime and fishing heritage, mainly focusing on the history of Yarmouth and the herring curing works. The museum feature various exhibitions including a typical 'Row' (a type of narrow street) from 1913, a Yarmouth quayside from the 1950s and hands on displays, films, audio guides and children's activities. The museum is currently visited by around 30,000 people a year.

Time & Tide museum is part of Maritime Heritage East which is a partnership of over 35 maritime museums in the East of England.

Awards 
The Time and Tide Museum has won, and been nominated for, some awards in the recent years:
Gulbenkian Prize Museum of the Year Finalist 2005
European Museum of the Year Finalist 2006
Objective 2 Celebrate Award Winner (Tourism Category) 2006
Eastern Daily Press Design & Development Award Winner 2006

Herring Curing Works Renovation 
The Time and Tide Museum is set in Britain's best-preserved herring curing works. This was closed down in the mid-1980s, but £4.7 million was spent on refurbishing and converting the Grade II listed factory into the modern museum.

References 

Time and Tide Museum review from the Norfolk Museums and Archaeology Service
Tide and Time Museum information from the Scott Wilson Group, a UK-based civil engineering consultancy
Information on the Time and Tide Museum and its place in Great Yarmouth from the BBC website for Norfolk

External links 
 Official site at Museums Norfolk
 culture24.org.uk
 bbc.co.uk
 Maritime Heritage East

Museums in Norfolk
Maritime museums in England
Local museums in Norfolk
Great Yarmouth